Chen Ming-chi (born 6 August 1947) is a Taiwanese sprinter. He competed in the men's 4 × 100 metres relay at the 1972 Summer Olympics.

References

1947 births
Living people
Athletes (track and field) at the 1968 Summer Olympics
Athletes (track and field) at the 1972 Summer Olympics
Taiwanese male sprinters
Taiwanese male long jumpers
Taiwanese male triple jumpers
Olympic athletes of Taiwan
Place of birth missing (living people)